Dom Hetrakul (June 18, 1974 in Bangkok, Thailand), is a well-known actor. He has acted in many Thai TV shows and films. He is also in Hollywood productions with a frequent presence in martial arts sagas.

Biography 
Dom Hetrakul is a member of the family that has run the Daily News, Thai newspaper, for nearly 50 years. He has managed director of Britbike, the authorised distributor of Triumph motorcycles from the United Kingdom.

Filmography

Television

TV Series

TV Programs 
 Deal or No Deal Thailand (2005)
 Kratuk Namtoey (Thailand)|ITV (2006-2007)
 Game Nana Chart (Thailand)|Channel 3
 Sing Nak Sueb (Thailand)|Channel 5
 Game La Maha Sanook (Thailand)|Channel 5

Movies Voice Recorder
 Puss in Boots (2011) | Puss in Boots (Thai)
 Shrek Forever After (2010) | Shrek (Thai)
 Monsters VS Aliens (2009) | Missing Link (Thai)
 The Dark Knight (2008) | Bruce Wayne/Batman (Thai)
 Shrek 3 (2007) | Puss in Boots (Thai)
 Over the Hedge (2006) | RJ (Thai)
 Batman Begins (2005) | PBruce Wayne/Batman (Thai)

Music Video 
 Mai Rak Dee / Paper Jam 
 Rak Ter Tee Sud / Mint Attawadee
 Kord Kan / Bird Thongchai (Smile Club)
 Rao Sam Kon / Fourth Narumon (Fourth Inspiration)

Awards 
 Phra Suraswati Award 1998 / Best Supporting Actor (Crime King)
 Nataraj Award 2020 / Best Supporting Actor (Oum Rak Game Luang)
 Kom Chad Luek Award 2020 / Best Supporting Actor (Oum Rak Game Luang)

References

External links 
 
 
 

 

1976 births
Living people
Dom Hetrakul
Dom Hetrakul
Dom Hetrakul
Dom Hetrakul
Dom Hetrakul
Dom Hetrakul
Dom Hetrakul